The United States Air Force Academy Cemetery is a cemetery at the United States Air Force Academy in Colorado Springs, El Paso County, Colorado. It is administered by the 10th Air Base Wing.

History 
The U.S. Air Force Academy cemetery was established in 1958. It accepts burials for graduates of the Air Force Academy, along with personnel assigned to the Academy, USAF officers in the rank of Lieutenant General and above, recipients of the Air Force Cross or Medal of  Honor, along with their spouses and dependent children. As of 2020 it hosts approximately 2,500 interments.

Notable interments
 Medal of Honor recipients
 William J. Crawford, for action in World War II; US Army retired Master Sergeant and long-time janitor-student mentor at the Academy
 General officers
 Samuel E. Anderson, Commander of 5th Air Force, Korean War.
 Salvador E. Felices, First Puerto Rican to reach the rank of Major General in the United States Air Force. Pilot of the first flight of a KC-135.
 Harold L. George, espoused precision daylight bombing methods, unofficial leader of the Bomber Mafia, first leader of Air Transport Command
Haywood S. Hansell, one of the chief architects of the concept of daylight precision bombing during World War II
 Hubert R. Harmon, first Superintendent of the Air Force Academy
 Curtis LeMay, Air Force Chief of Staff and the father of Strategic Air Command (SAC)
 John P. McConnell, sixth Air Force Chief of Staff
 Robin Olds, Air Force brigadier general and fighter ace
 Samuel C. Phillips, Air Force four-star general, Director of Apollo Program through Apollo 11.
 John Dale Ryan, seventh Air Force Chief of Staff
 Donavon F. Smith, Air Force lieutenant general and fighter ace
 Carl Spaatz, first Air Force Chief of Staff
 Louis L. Wilson Jr., Commander of Pacific Air Forces
 Don Z. Zimmerman,  first Dean of Faculty at the United States Air Force Academy
 Valorous Award Recipients
 Col. Kennith F. Hite, awarded the Silver Star and three Distinguished Flying Crosses during 203 combat missions in Korea and Vietnam.
 Col. Kelly F. Cook, combat veteran of three wars, recipient of the Distinguished Flying Cross, Air Medal and Purple Heart. Member of the Academy's original instructional cadre when it opened in the late 1950s.  Declared Missing-in-Action November 10, 1967 when his F-4 went down over Quang Tri Province.
 Purple Heart Recipients
 Laura A. Piper, first female Air Force Academy graduate to be awarded the Purple Heart, killed April 14, 1994 (Piper was a passenger on a UH-60 Black Hawk Helicopter and was shot down due to a friendly fire incident during a non-combat humanitarian aid mission after Operation Desert Storm).
 Maj. David L. Brodeur, died from wounds sustained from enemy gunfire. He was an advisor to the Afghan Command and Control Center under the NATO Air Training Command at the Kabul International Airport (Operation Enduring Freedom in Afghanistan); awarded the Bronze Star Medal and Purple Heart, killed April 27, 2011.
 Maj. Philip D. Ambard, died from wounds sustained from enemy gunfire. He was an advisor to the Afghan Command and Control Center under the NATO Air Training Command at the Kabul International Airport (Operation Enduring Freedom in Afghanistan); awarded the Bronze Star Medal and Purple Heart, killed April 27, 2011.
 Capt. David I. Lyon, killed in action from an enemy vehicle-born improvised explosive device was detonated near his convoy during Operation Enduring Freedom in Kabul, Afghanistan.  He was a combat advisor, working with the Combined Joint Special Operations Task Force - Afghanistan; awarded the Bronze Star Medal and Purple Heart, killed December 27, 2013.
 Maj. Rodolfo I. Rodriguez, died from wounds sustained from an improvised explosive device at a hotel in Islamabad, Pakistan while deployed to the U.S. Embassy (Pakistan) in support of Operation Enduring Freedom.  He was posthumously awarded the Bronze Star Medal, Purple Heart, Meritorious Service Medal and Air Force Combat Action Medal, killed September 20, 2008.

Others
 Matt Fong, Air Force Reserve Command officer, California State Treasurer

See also 
 List of cemeteries in Colorado

References

External links
 
 

Cemetery
Air Force Academy Cemetery
Cemeteries in Colorado